The Left Bloc (abbr. BE, colloquially shortened as O Bloco) is a left-wing populist, democratic socialist political party in Portugal founded in 1999. It is currently led by Catarina Martins.

History

Formation and early history 

The Left Bloc was formed in March 1999 by the merger of the Marxist People's Democratic Union, Trotskyist Revolutionary Socialist Party, and the democratic socialist Politics XXI. It has had full party status since its founding, yet the constituent groups have maintained their existence as individual political associations, retaining some levels of autonomy in a loose structure. In the 1999 legislative election the BE polled at 2%. In 2002 this rose to 3%.

First parliamentary representation 

In the 1999 election BE received 2.4% of the votes leading them to enter the Assembly of the Republic for the first time with 2 MPs for the Lisbon constituency. These representatives were Francisco Louçã and Fernando Rosas. In the 2005 election BE received 6.5% of the votes winning them 8 MPs. In the 2006 presidential elections, the Left Bloc's candidate, Francisco Louçã, received 288,224 votes (5.31%).

In the 2009 European Parliament election they received 10.73% winning them 3 MEPs. They also surpassed the CDU for the first time in an election. At the subsequent 2009 national election, the party obtained 9.81% of votes and 16 members of parliament in the 230-seat Assembly of the Republic.

The financial crisis led socialist prime minister Sócrates to agree to a bailout memorandum with the Eurogroup. In the subsequent 2011 snap election, the country saw a massive shift to the right, with the Left Bloc losing nearly half of its previous popular support, obtaining only 5.17% of the vote and 8 members of parliament. This defeat is generally attributed to the partial support certain sections of the party appeared to offer the unpopular Socialist government while the latter pursued an austerity program in response to the financial crisis.

Renewal, split and recovery 

The historical merger of ideologies that gave rise to the Portuguese Left Bloc was a process that lasted sixteen years. Its main actors aged and times changed, which led to an awareness of the need for modernization and realism. Francisco Louçã is one of the founders who most insisted on restricting theory to the basic humanistic and ethical principles common to partisans and supporters in order to conquer a wider range of constituencies. The game would necessarily be played in the framework of democracy, active participation and defence of human rights. After thirteen years of intensive labor as a leader, Louçã quit the position of party chairman in 2012 arguing that "it is time for renewal" and delegating his functions to a man and a woman.  Catarina Martins, 39 years old, and João Semedo, a veteran, would be elected co-chairmen of the party on November 11, 2012. However, the renewal process would last for over one year.

In early 2014, the Left Bloc suffered a split, when elected Left Bloc MEP Rui Tavares, who already in 2011 had become an independent, founded left-ecologist LIVRE party. Left-wing intellectuals who had come together to the Manifesto 3D collective challenged the Left Bloc to converge with LIVRE towards a joined list in the upcoming 2014 European election. Two official meetings in late 2014 and early 2015 however failed with the Left Bloc referring to programmatic differences with Tavares. So while the severe austerity programs under prime minister Passos Coelho did backdrop on the Portuguese political right, the European election in May saw the Socialists and liberal Earth Party as relative winners, whereas the Left Bloc lost more than half of 2009's votes and two of its three mandates. LIVRE received 2.2% but failed to win any mandate.

On 10 November 2015, the Left Bloc signed an agreement with the Socialist Party that is aimed at identifying convergence issues, while also recognizing their differences. The Bloc supported the minority Socialist Costa Government (2015–2019) with a confidence and supply agreement. The Socialist Party government would be re-elected in 2019, with the Left Bloc returning to opposition. The party voted against the 2022 budget, triggering an election in January of that year. The Left Bloc would lose 14 seats, reducing them to five, and over half of their popular vote from 2019 — tactical voting for the Socialist Party and the Left Bloc's opposition to the budget were blamed. The Socialist Party would be re-elected with a majority government.

Ideology, political position and policies 
The Left Bloc rose to prominence "following a successful anti-austerity campaign and its backing by a growing popular social movement." It has been described as "Portugal’s biggest supporter of feminist, gay rights and anti-racist legislation" and been associated with the New Left. It occupies a flexible and moderate position to the left of the Socialist Party (PS). The Bloc has proposed a number of important laws on civil rights and guarantees, including the protection of citizens from racist, xenophobic, and homophobic discrimination, support for same-sex marriage, laws for the protection of workers and anti-bullfighting legislation. These included Portugal's first law on domestic violence, which was then passed in parliament with the support of the Portuguese Communist Party and the Socialist Party. In comparison to the Portuguese Communist Party, the Left Bloc has been described as "more socially libertarian". At present, together with the PS, Left Bloc aims at "building a stable, long-lasting and reliable majority at the Parliament, in order to support the formation and subsequent action of a government committed to the change demanded through the ballot box". This purpose foreshadows changes taking place not only in the Iberian Peninsula but as in all European territory.

The Left Bloc has called for the legalisation of cannabis in Portugal. The party attempted to pass legislation in Parliament regarding cannabis law reform in Portugal in 2013 and 2015, both of which were rejected by the then ruling centre-right coalition government.

In terms of economics the party advocates "greater state intervention in the economy in order to reduce inequalities", such as rises to the minimum wage. It has also put forward "many legislative proposals defending salaries, pensions and the welfare state". The party has been described by some sources as being anti-capitalist. In September 2019, the party called for the minimum monthly wage to be raised to €650 for both the public and private sectors in January 2020.

Electoral results

Assembly of the Republic 
Vote share in the Portuguese legislative elections

European Parliament

Regional Assemblies

List of coordinators

See also 
 List of political parties in Portugal

References

External links 
 
Website of the newspaper "Esquerda" 
What is the Left Bloc? - Article

 
1999 establishments in Portugal
Anti-capitalist political parties
Democratic socialist parties in Europe
Ecosocialist parties
Eurosceptic parties in Portugal
Far-left politics in Europe
Feminist parties in Europe
Left-wing populism
Multi-tendency organizations
Organisations based in Lisbon
Party of the European Left member parties
Political parties established in 1999
Political parties in Portugal
Socialist parties in Portugal
Left-wing parties